Jean-Lesage is a provincial electoral district in the Capitale-Nationale region of Quebec, Canada that elects members to the National Assembly of Quebec. It consists of parts of the Beauport and La Cité-Limoilou boroughs of Quebec City.

It was created for the 2003 election from most of the former Limoilou and part of Montmorency electoral districts.  Even earlier, before Limoilou, the electoral district of Québec-Est existed in the same general area.

In the change from the 2001 to the 2011 electoral map, it lost some territory to Montmorency but gained some territory from Taschereau; it also gained a tiny amount of territory from Charlesbourg.

It was named after former Quebec Premier Jean Lesage who orchestrated the Quiet Revolution from 1960 to 1966.

Members of the National Assembly

Election results

|}

^ Change is from redistributed results. CAQ change is from ADQ.

|-
 
|Liberal
|Andre Drolet
|align="right"|14,196
|align="right"|46.48
|align="right"|

|-

|Independent
|Jose Breton
|align="right"|314
|align="right"|1.03
|align="right"|
|}

|-
 
|Liberal
|Michel Després
|align="right"|10,185
|align="right"|29.28
|align="right"|

|-

|-

|Independent
|Jose Breton
|align="right"|131
|align="right"|0.38
|align="right"|
|-

|-

|}

|-
 
|Liberal
|Michel Després
|align="right"|15547
|align="right"|44.22
|align="right"|

|-

|Independent
|Jean-Yves Desgagnés
|align="right"|714
|align="right"|2.03
|align="right"|
|-

|-

|}

References

External links
Information
 Elections Quebec

Election results
 Election results (National Assembly)

Maps
 2011 map (PDF)
 2001 map (Flash)
2001–2011 changes (Flash)
1992–2001 changes to Limoilou (Flash)
 Electoral map of Capitale-Nationale region
 Quebec electoral map, 2011

Provincial electoral districts of Quebec City
Jean-Lesage